Schistura deignani is a species of stone loach from the genus Schistura. It is found in Thailand. It is considered by some authorities to be a synonym of Schistura kohchangensis.

References 

D
Fish described in 1945